NOCO Energy Corporation is a family-owned and operated corporation based in Tonawanda, New York (a suburb of Buffalo).  The company specializes in gasoline, commercial fuels, industrial lubricants, bio-products, home energy fuel, and heating and cooling systems. NOCO operates over 30 gas stations in Western New York.

History
The company was founded in 1933 by Reginald B. Newman; it was incorporated as R.B. Newman Fuel Company on January 12, 1948.  Donald F. Newman and Reginald B. Newman II, his sons, joined the company in 1954 and 1960, respectively.  With the sons there, the company acquired a new terminal facility and expanded the product lines.  The company's first gas station was opened in 1964.

NOCO Energy Corporation-Mighty Taco relations
As of Friday July 16, 2010, Mighty Taco has an outlet in a NOCO Energy Corporation-Owned NOCO Express store in Buffalo.  The two companies have a deal that will last 10 years.

NOCO Energy Corporation opens first stores in the City of Buffalo
In March 2014; NOCO bought out a privately owned gas station at Elmwood and Forest. In July, NOCO announced its takeover of another privately owned gas station on Lexington and Elmwood, as well as the Tim Hortons at that location. These being the first two NOCO owned stores in the city proper, NOCO is expected to take over more privately owned gas stations if these two locations do well.

References

External links
NOCO Energy Corp. official website
NOCO announces start of ethanol initiative

Automotive fuel retailers
Oil companies of the United States
Companies based in Erie County, New York
Privately held companies based in New York (state)
Convenience stores of the United States
Non-renewable resource companies established in 1933
1933 establishments in New York (state)